West Chinnock is a village in Somerset, England,  north east of Crewkerne, both in the South Somerset district. It occupies a central position east of the road that links Crewkerne to the A303 road and is mainly south of a brook that feeds nearby into the Parrett.  The village forms the civil parish of West and Middle Chinnock with the neighbouring village of Middle Chinnock.  The parish has a population of 592 (2011 census).

West Chinnock was a separate civil parish until 1884.  It then absorbed the parish of Middle Chinnock.  In 2003 the parish was renamed West and Middle Chinnock.

History

The origin of the name Chinnock is uncertain.  It may be derived from the Old English cinu meaning ravine or cinn meaning a chin shaped hill, with the addition of ock meaning little.  An alternative derivation may be an old hill-name of Celtic origin.

The Chinnocks were held as one estate in Saxon times by Wynflaed under Shaftesbury Abbey but by the time of the Norman Conquest in 1066 East Chinnock, West Chinnock and Middle Chinnock had been separated.

Governance
The parish council has co-responsibility for some local issues so sets an annual precept (local rate) to cover its costs and makes annual accounts for public scrutiny. It can submit its evaluation report into all planning applications and works with police, other councils' officers, and neighbourhood watch groups on matters of crime/security, traffic and highways. Conservation matters (including trees and listed buildings) and the environment can be in its reports and initiatives. It maintains and repairs some of, and consults with both higher-tier councils, as to more of, sports/leisure facilities, verges, parks, surface water drainage, paths, public transit and street cleaning.

The village is in the Non-metropolitan district of South Somerset, which was formed on 1 April 1974 under the Local Government Act 1972 from part of Yeovil Rural District. It is responsible for local planning and building control, most of the streetscenes and parks, council housing, environmental health, markets and fairs, refuse collection and recycling, cemeteries and crematoria, leisure services, and tourism. 
As to those councillors it is in its 'Parrett' electoral ward. This stretches from Chiselborough in the north, via East Chinnock to North Perrott in the south. The ward population at the 2011 census was 2,336.

Somerset County Council is responsible for running the largest and most expensive local services such as education, social services, libraries, main roads, public transport, policing and  fire services, trading standards, waste disposal and strategic planning.

It is served by the Yeovil seat in the House of Commons of the Parliament of the United Kingdom.

Landmarks
The Manor Farmhouse in West Chinnock retains large parts from the late 16th or early 17th century thus is in the middle category of listed buildings.

Church

Ecclesiastically the parish of West Chinnock is now part of the united benefice of Norton-sub-Hamdon, West Chinnock, Chiselborough and Middle Chinnock.

The parish Church of Saint Mary has 13th-century origins but was totally rebuilt in the 19th century.

Notable residents
 The second of the Austin baronets, died November 1940, was finally resident here.
Retired brigadier Cyrus Greenslade, OBE, MBE, Legion of Merit (U.S.): Commander died aged 93, owner-occupier of the Manor House.
Retired director of the British Banking Association, then AIB, Timothy Patrick Sweeney (born 1944) – a resident of West Chinnock.
Retired major Ronald Williams (Liberal politician), the 1923–1924 MP of the Sevenoaks seat, Kent, died 1971 – his latter home at: West Chinnock.

Gallery

References

External links

Villages in South Somerset